The fields of Forel are areas in a deep part of the brain known as the diencephalon. They are below the thalamus and consist of three defined, white matter areas of the subthalamus. These three regions are also named "H fields":
Field H1, is the thalamic fasciculus, a horizontal white matter tract composed of the ansa lenticularis, lenticular fasciculus, and cerebellothalamic tracts between the subthalamus and the thalamus. These fibers are projections to the ventral anterior and ventral lateral thalamus from the basal ganglia (globus pallidus) and the cerebellum. H1 is separated from H2 by the zona incerta.
Field H2 (synonymous with lenticular fasciculus) is also made up of projections from the pallidum to the thalamus, but these course the subthalamic nucleus (dorsal).
Field H (sometimes called field H3) is a large zone of mixed grey and white matter from the pallidothalamic tracts of the lenticular fasciculus and the ansa lenticularis which combine in an area just in front of the red nucleus. The grey matter from this field is said to form a prerubral nucleus.

Nuclei campi perizonalis
Nuclei campi perizonalis or the nuclei of the perizonal fields (of Forel) are a group of nuclei in the ventral thalamus and are considered part of the subthalamus, they comprise 3 groups of nuclei arranged as follows:
Nucleus campi medialis: the nucleus of prerubral field (field H)
Nucleus campi dorsalis: Neurons scattered along the thalamic fasciculi in field H1 of Forel 
Nucleus campi ventralis: Neurons scattered along the lenticular fasciculi in field H2 of Forel

External links
Fields of Forel - Biology Online Dictionary
Forel, A. (1877). "Untersuchungen über die Haubenregion und ihre oberen Verknüpfungen im Gehirne des Menschen und einiger Säugethiere, mit Beiträgen zu den Methoden der Gehirnuntersuchung". Archiv für Psychiatrie und Nervenkrankheiten 7: 393–495. .

References

Subthalamus